Cáñar is a small village in the Alpujarras comarca of the province of Granada in Spain.  It is located a few kilometres north of the road from Órgiva to Pampaneira and the high Alpujarras.  The GR 7 long-distance footpath, following the ancient highway through the Alpujarras, runs through the village.

The area of the municipality is 26 km²., and it is located at a height of 1014 metres above sea level.  Its population in 2005 was estimated as 366 people, of whom 69 were not Spanish citizens, most of these being citizens of other European Union countries.  The village has few facilities for tourists other than a handful of bars, and is of a very traditional Alpujarran character, with animal stabling integrated into houses that open onto the main street and square. The villagers are extremely welcoming and celebrate all the major festivals enthusiastically. The "patrona" of the village is Santa Ana and the associated fiesta takes place on and around 26 July each year.

Cáñar has several accommodation options ranging from small apartments to let in the village, cortijos further up into the sierra and the acclaimed "El Cielo de Canar" boutique hotel is situated just 2 km outside the village.

Between Cáñar and the neighbouring village to the east, Soportújar, lies a remarkable dam across the deep gorge of the Chico river.  This is known as "Dique 24" and was built in 1942 to control the destructive flash floods that the Rio Chico sometimes unleashes.  The GR7 footpath crosses the stream just above the dam.

References

External links 
Tourist information and Las Alpujarras community portal - Cáñar

Municipalities in the Province of Granada